Karel Govaert (19 July 1900 – 11 August 1972) was a Belgian racing cyclist. He rode in the 1923 Tour de France.

References

1900 births
1972 deaths
Belgian male cyclists
Place of birth missing